The Tartaks is a river in Latvia. It is 18 kilometres long. It discharges into the lake Luknas, which is drained by the Dubna.

See also
List of rivers of Latvia

Rivers of Latvia